Eli Kassner,  (27 May 1924 – 23 August 2018) was a Canadian classical guitar teacher and musician.

Eli Kassner studied guitar in Vienna and Israel before moving to Canada in 1951. He also studied in the United States, Israel, and in Spain, under the great virtuoso classical guitarist, Andrés Segovia. He performed until 1967.

In 1956, he founded the Guitar Society of Toronto. He was its president from 1960 to 1966 and artistic director from 1970 to 2008. In 1967, he established the Eli Kassner Guitar Academy.

He established the guitar program at the University of Toronto and The Royal Conservatory of Music in Toronto (RCMT) in 1959 and started the University of Toronto Guitar Ensemble in 1978.

In the 1970s, Kassner became interested in microphotography, and worked as a composer and performer for the CBC Television series The Lively Arts and The Nature of Things.

Eli Kassner was awarded an honorary doctorate from Carleton University and was also inducted into the Guitar Foundation of America's Hall of Fame. In 2009, the Guitar Society of Toronto, honored Eli Kassner with a lifetime 'Artistic Director Emeritus' appointment.

In 2016, he was appointed as a Member of the Order of Canada.

Notable students
 Liona Boyd
 Annabelle Chvostek
 Jesse Cook
 Atom Egoyan
 Norbert Kraft
 Gordon O'Brien
 Pavlo Simtikidis
 Timothy Phelan

Bibliography
 Smith, Harold. "Eli Kassner: a biography" Guitar Canada, vol 2, Spring 1989
 Levy, Harold. "The road to respect", ibid
 Blackadar, Bruce. "Ovation for a guitar master", Toronto Star, 20 May 1989

References

External links
 
 
 

1924 births
2018 deaths
Musicians from Vienna
Austrian emigrants to Canada
Canadian classical guitarists
Canadian male guitarists
Musicians from Toronto
The Royal Conservatory of Music alumni
Members of the Order of Canada
20th-century classical musicians
20th-century Canadian male musicians